Stadion NŠC Stjepan Spajić is a football stadium in the Siget neighborhood of Zagreb, Croatia. It was built in 2000 and serves as home stadium for the NK Hrvatski Dragovoljac football club.  The stadium has an all seater capacity of 5,000 spectators. It is named after the late club president Stjepan Spajić.

Sports venues in Zagreb
NK Hrvatski Dragovoljac
Stjepan Spajic